John III, Count of Ligny (died 1 July 1576) was the eldest son of Count Anthony II and his wife Margaret of Savoy.  He succeeded his father as Count of Brienne and Ligny in 1557.

He arrived in Edinburgh on 2 November 1566 as the ambassador of Savoy and was lodged in Henry Kinloch's house in the Canongate near Holyrood Palace. He visited Craigmillar Castle to meet Mary, Queen of Scots on 20 November, and went to Stirling Castle on 12 December for the baptism of Prince James, escorted by George Seton, 7th Lord Seton. He gave the queen a necklace of pearl and rubies and earrings.

Marriage and family
John married Wilhelmina (d. 1592), the daughter of Duke Robert IV of Bouillon.  Together, they had the following children:
 Anthony
 Charles II (1562-1608), his successor, elevated to Duke of Brienne in 1587
 Margaret (1562-1566)
 Francis (1563-1576), succeeded Charles II as Count of Ligny. He married in 1576 Diane of Lorraine (1558-1597):
Henry III (1582-1616), Duke of Piney-Luxembourg and Count of Ligny. He married in 1597 Madeleine de Montmorency (1582-1615):
Marguerite-Charlotte de Ligny (1607-1680), Duchess of Piney-Luxembourg and Countess of Ligny, married in  Charles-Henri de Clermont-Tonnerre († 1674):
Madeleine-Charlotte de Clermont-Tonnerre (1635-1701), Duchess of Piney-Luxembourg and Countess of Ligny, married in 1661 François-Henri de Montmorency-Bouteville, Count of Luxembourg (1628-1695):
 Charles de Montmorency (1662-1726), Duke of Piney-Luxembourg and Count of Ligny, married in 1696 Marie-Gilonne Gillier de Clérembault (1677-1709), with issue.
 Christian-Louis de Montmorency-Luxembourg (1675-1746), Prince of Tingry, married in 1711 Madeleine de Harlay de Beaumont (1694-1749), with issue.
 Diana (d. 1624), married:
Louis of Plusquelec, Count of Kerman
Justus of Pontailler, Baron of Pleurs
 Louise (1567-1647), married:
 Baron George of Casaubon
 Bernard of Béon, Seigneur de Massez

References

Counts of Ligny
House of Luxembourg
Year of birth unknown
1576 deaths
Counts of France
16th-century French people